The Roman Catholic Archdiocese of Lviv (of the Latins) is a Metropolitan archdiocese of the Latin Church of the Catholic Church in western Ukraine.

Its Cathedral archiepiscopal see is a Minor Basilica and (Minor) World Heritage Site: Metropolitan Cathedral Basilica of the Assumption of the Blessed Virgin Mary, in Lviv (Львів), Lviv Oblast
The diocese has  a second Minor Basilica: Basilica of the Exaltation of the Holy Cross, in Chernivtsi (Чернівці), Chernivtsi Oblast.

Archbishop Mieczyslaw Mokrzycki is the current metropolitan archbishop of the archdiocese. In Kyiv exists Apostolic Nunciature to Ukraine since 1992.

History 
The diocese was canonically erected in 1358 as Diocese of Lviv / Lwow / Leopoli (Italian) / Leopolitan(us) Latinorum (Latin adjective)
 Promoted on August 28, 1412 by Pope Gregory XII as Metropolitan Archdiocese of Lviv / Lwow / Leopoli (Curiate Italian) / Leopolitan(us) Latinorum (Latin), having gained territory from the suppressed Metropolitan Archdiocese of Halyč (in Slavic Galicia)
 Lost territory on 1930.06.05 to Diocese of Iaşi (Romania)
 Gained territory in 1945 from Diocese of Przemyśl (Poland, now Metropolitan)
 Lost territory in 1991 to establish the Apostolic Administration of Lubaczów. 
 Pope John Paul II visited the archdiocese as part of his papal visit to Ukraine in June 2001. This included a Papal Address to the young people in Lviv.

Statistics  
As per 2014, it pastorally served 138,500 Roman Catholics (3.1% of 4,500,000 total) on 68,000 km² in 278 parishes with 196 priests (140 diocesan, 56 religious), 215 lay religious (76 brothers, 139 sisters) and 32 seminarians.

As of 16 July 2007 there were 138 priests, 1 permanent deacon and 213 religious in the archdiocese.

Ecclesiastical province 
The Metropolitan of the Archdiocese has six Latin suffragan sees : 
 Roman Catholic Diocese of Kamyanets-Podilskyi
 Roman Catholic Diocese of Kharkiv-Zaporizhia
 Roman Catholic Diocese of Kyiv-Zhytomyr
 Roman Catholic Diocese of Lutsk
 Roman Catholic Diocese of Mukacheve 
 Roman Catholic Diocese of Odessa-Simferopol.

Episcopal ordinaries
(all Roman Rite)
Also see/WORK-IN List of Roman Catholic bishops of Lviv

Suffragan Bishops of Lviv
 Konrad (? – ?)
 ? 1375–1380 Maciej
 ? 1384–1390 Bernard
 ? 1391–1409 blessed Jakub Strzemię (Jakub Strepa)
 ? 1410–1412 Mikołaj Trąba
 Jerzy Eberhardi, Friars Minor (O.F.M.) (1390.03.16 – ?)
 Herman Wytkind, Dominican Order (O.P.) (1401.01.07 – ?)

Metropolitan Archbishops of Lviv
 Jan Rzeszowski (1414.12.23 – death 1436.08.12), ''previously (last) Metropolitan Archbishop of merged-in Roman Catholic Archdiocese of Halyč (Galicia, Ukraine) (1412.08.26 – 1414.12.23)
 
 TO COMPLETE / ELABORATE
 ...
 ...
 Coadjutor Archbishop: Ferdynand Onufry Kicki (1778.09.28 – 1780.10.25)
 ...
 Andrzej Alojzy Ankwicz (25 March 1815 - 30 Sep 1833), next metropolitan Archbishop of Praha (Prague)
 Franz Xaver Luschin (18 March 1834 - 9 Jan 1835), next Archbishop of Gorizia e Gradisca
 St. Józef Bilczewski (17 Dec 1900 - death 30 March 1923)
 Boleslaw Twardowski (3 August 1923 - death 22 Nov 1945)
 Eugeniusz Baziak (22 Nov 1945 - death 15 June 1962)
 Marian Cardinal Jaworski (16 Jan 1990 - Retired 21 Oct 2008)
 Mieczysław Mokrzycki (21 Oct 2008 - ... ).

Auxiliary episcopate 
TO BE ELABORATED AND WORKED-IN
 Auxiliary Bishop: Marian Buczek (2002.05.04 – 2007.07.16)
•Auxiliary Bishop: Stanislaw Padewski, O.F.M. Cap. (1998 – 2002.05.04)
•Auxiliary Bishop: Markijan Trofimiak (1991.01.16 – 1998.03.25)
•Auxiliary Bishop: Rafal Kiernicki, O.F.M. Conv. (1991.01.16 – 1995.11.23)
•Auxiliary Bishop: Eugeniusz Baziak (later Archbishop) (1933.09.15 – 1944.03.01)
•Auxiliary Bishop: Francis Lisowski (1928.07.20 – 1933.01.27)
•Auxiliary Bishop: Bolesław Twardowski (later Archbishop) (1918.09.14 – 1923.08.03)
•Auxiliary Bishop: Wladyslaw Bandurski (1906.09.26 – 1932.03.06)
•Auxiliary Bishop: Joseph Weber, C.R. (1895.12.02 – 1906.05.26)
•Auxiliary Bishop: Jan Puzyna de Kosielsko (later Cardinal) (1886.02.26 – 1895.01.22)
•Auxiliary Bishop: Seweryn Morawski (later Archbishop) (1881.05.13 – 1885.02.15)
•Auxiliary Bishop: Valery Henryk Kamionko (1815.07.10 – 1840.08.26)
•Auxiliary Bishop: Kajetan Ignacy Kicki (later Archbishop) (1783.07.18 – 1797.12.18)
•Auxiliary Bishop: Ferdynand Onufry Kicki (later Archbishop) (1777.04.23 – 1778.09.28)
•Auxiliary Bishop: Kryspin Cieszkowski (1772.12.14 – 1792?)
•Auxiliary Bishop: Samuel Głowiński (1733.12.02 – 1776.09.14)
•Auxiliary Bishop: Hieronim Maciej Jełowicki (1725.02.21 – 1732.01.08)
•Auxiliary Bishop: Stefan Bogusław Rupniewski (1713.05.22 – 1716.12.23)
•Auxiliary Bishop: John Skarbek (later Archbishop) (1696.01.02 – 1713.01.30)

See also 
 List of Catholic dioceses in Ukraine
 Roman Catholicism in Ukraine

Footnotes

Sources and external links 
GCatholic.org - data for all sections
Website of the Archdiocese
catholic-hierarchy.org

Roman Catholic dioceses in Ukraine
Religious organizations established in the 1410s
Roman Catholic dioceses established in the 15th century
1412 establishments in Europe